Pine Lake may refer to two separate lakes in Chisago County, Minnesota

Pine Lake in Nessel Township was named for the white pines near the lake shore.
Pine Lake.

See also
List of lakes in Minnesota

References

Lakes of Minnesota
Lakes of Chisago County, Minnesota